A Son of the Sun is the debut album by Uyama Hiroto, released on Hydeout Productions on July 16, 2008. Although the album is considered as hip-hop, it incorporates jazzy sounds of multi-layered piano, guitar, saxophone, and keyboards, with little vocals involved. The album combines live instrumentation with samples.

Track listing

Credits
Artwork By: FJD
Executive Producer - Nujabes
Management Production: Takumi Koizumi
Mastered By: Nujabes
Mixed By: Nujabes, Uyama Hiroto
Producer: Uyama Hiroto

References

Albums produced by Nujabes
2008 debut albums
Uyama Hiroto albums
Instrumental hip hop albums